Retrograde may refer to:

Film and television 
 Retrograde (2004 film), a film by Christopher Kulikowski
 Retrograde (2022 film), a documentary film by Matthew Heineman
 Retrograde (TV series), a 2020 Australian television comedy series

Medicine and science  
 Retrograde amnesia, a loss of memory-access to past events
 Retrograde ejaculation, the redirection of ejaculated semen into the urinary bladder
 Retrograde metamorphism, the recrystallization of rocks under decreasing pressure and/or temperature
 Retrograde motion, the opposite direction of a celestial body's apparent orbit
 Retrograde signaling, the process where a signal travels backwards from a target source to its original source
 Apparent retrograde motion, the apparent motion of planets as observed from a particular vantage point

Music and entertainment 
 Retrograde (album), a 2016 album by Crown the Empire
 Retrograde (Dinah Jane song), a 2019 single by Dinah Jane
 Retrograde (James Blake song), a 2013 single from the album Overgrown
 Retrograde (music), the playing back of a passage of notes
 Retrograde (Pearl Jam song), a 2019 single by American rock band Pearl Jam
 Retrograde inversion, a type of musical permutation
 Retro/Grade, a video game developed by 24 Caret Games

Other uses 
 Retrograde analysis, in chess problems
 Reverse dictionary, sometimes called retrograde dictionary

See also 
 Retrogradation, a landward change in position of the front of a river delta with time
 Retrogradation (starch), the gelatinization of starch when the amylose and amylopectin chains realign themselves